Parliamentary elections were held in São Tomé and Príncipe on 25 September 2022.

Electoral system
Of the 55 members of the National Assembly, 53 are elected by closed list proportional representation in seven multi-member constituencies based on the seven districts. Overseas voters are grouped in two single member electoral districts (Europe and Africa).

Campaign

A total of 10 parties and one coalition participate in the election.

Results

Elected MPs

References

Sao Tome
Legislative
Elections in São Tomé and Príncipe
Sao Tome